Tabocão is a municipality in the state of Tocantins in the Northern region of Brazil.

It was known as Fortaleza do Tabocão until 2019, when a plebiscite approved the change of the name and consequently, the state's governor made a law approving the name change of the municipality.

See also
List of municipalities in Tocantins

References

Municipalities in Tocantins